Novomykhailivka, may refer to several places in Ukraine:

Dnipropetrovsk Oblast
Novomykhailivka, Sofiyivka Raion, a village in Sofiyivka Raion
Novomykhailivka, Tomakivka Raion, a village in Tomakivka Raion

Donetsk Oblast
Novomykhailivka, Lyman Raion, a village in Lyman Raion
Novomykhailivka, Pokrovsk Raion, a village in Pokrovsk Raion
Novomykhailivka, Starobesheve Raion, a village in Starobesheve Raion

Kherson Oblast
Novomykhailivka, Kherson Oblast, a village in Novotroitske Raion

Kharkiv Oblast
Novomykhailivka, Kharkiv Oblast, a village in Sakhnovshchyna Raion

Kirovohrad Oblast
Novomykhailivka, Dobrovelychkivka Raion, a village in Dobrovelychkivka Raion
Novomykhailivka, Dolynska Raion, a village in Dolynska Raion
Novomykhailivka, Mala Vyska Raion, a village in Mala Vyska Raion

Mykolaiv Oblast
Novomykhailivka, Arbuzynka Raion, a village in Arbuzynka Raion
Novomykhailivka, Mykolaiv Raion, a village in Mykolaiv Raion
Novomykhailivka, Novyi Buh Raion, a village in Novyi Buh Raion

Odesa Oblast
Novomykhailivka, Okny Raion, a village in Okny Raion
Novomykhailivka, Tatarbunary Raion, a village in Tatarbunary Raion

Sumy Oblast
Novomykhailivka, Sumy Oblast, a village in Sumy Raion

Zaporizhzhia Oblast
Novomykhailivka, Chernihivka Raion, a village in Chernihivka Raion
Novomykhailivka, Orikhiv Raion, a village in Orikhiv Raion